Psara dryalis is a moth in the family Crambidae. It was described by Francis Walker in 1859. It is found in the Dominican Republic, Puerto Rico, Jamaica, Cuba and from the southwestern United States to Central America.

The wingspan is about 26 mm. The wings are iridescent with purplish-cinereous interior and exterior lines and blackish marginal spots. Adults have been recorded on wing from July to September in the United States.

References

Spilomelinae
Moths described in 1859